The Okeechobee Correctional Institution  is a state prison for men located in Okeechobee, Okeechobee County, Florida, owned and operated by the Florida Department of Corrections.  

Okeechobee has a mix of security levels, including minimum, medium, and close, and houses adult male offenders.  The facility first opened in 1995 and has a maximum capacity of 1632 prisoners.

References

Prisons in Florida
Buildings and structures in Okeechobee County, Florida
1995 establishments in Florida